The 2019–20 Western Illinois Leathernecks men's basketball team represented Western Illinois University in the 2019–20 NCAA Division I men's basketball season. The Leathernecks, led by sixth-year head coach Billy Wright, played their home games at Western Hall in Macomb, Illinois, as members of the Summit League. They finished the season 5–21, 2–14 in Summit League play to finish in last place. They failed to qualify for the Summit League tournament.

On March 3, 2020, the school announced that head coach Billy Wright's contract would not be renewed. He finished at Western Illinois with a six-year record of 53–115. On March 30, the school announced former Milwaukee head coach Rob Jeter would be hired as the new head coach.

Previous season
The Leathernecks finished the 2018–19 season 10–21, 4–12 in Summit League play to finish in 8th place. They upset top-seeded South Dakota State in the quarterfinals of the Summit League tournament, before losing to North Dakota State in the semifinals.

Roster

Schedule and results

|-
!colspan=12 style=| Non-conference regular season

|-
!colspan=9 style=| Summit League regular season

|-

Source

References

Western Illinois Leathernecks men's basketball seasons
Western Illinois Leathernecks
Western Illinois Leathernecks men's basketball
Western Illinois Leathernecks men's basketball